Exclusively for My Friends: Lost Tapes is a 1995 studio album by jazz pianist Oscar Peterson, part of his Exclusively for My Friends series.

Reception

Writing for AllMusic, critic Scott Yanow wrote "The emphasis throughout is on O.P.'s virtuosity and melodic improvisations. Although the release does not add anything surprising to Peterson's legacy, his playing is up to the level of his other sets of the period"

Track listing
 "Gravy Waltz" (Steve Allen, Ray Brown) – 3:19
 "Three O'Clock in the Morning" (Julian Robledo, Dorothy Terriss) – 8:45
 "Squeaky's Blues" (Oscar Peterson) – 7:28
 "Tenderly" (Walter Gross, Jack Lawrence) – 11:06
 "I Will Wait for You" (Jacques Demy, Norman Gimbel, Michel Legrand) – 6:53
 "Let's Fall in Love" (Harold Arlen, Ted Koehler) – 4:28
 "Put on a Happy Face" (Lee Adams, Charles Strouse) – 6:34
 "Stella by Starlight" (Ned Washington, Victor Young) – 5:15
 "Moanin''" (Bobby Timmons) – 5:38
 "Never Say Yes" (Doc Pomus, Mort Shuman) – 5:22
 "It's Impossible" (Peterson) – 6:55
 "My Romance" (Lorenz Hart, Richard Rodgers) – 3:57

Personnel

Performance
 Oscar Peterson – piano, all tracks
 Ray Brown - double bass, tracks 1-4
 Ed Thigpen – drums, tracks 1-4
 Sam Jones - double bass, tracks 5-12
 Bobby Durham - drums, tracks 5-12

References

1995 albums
Oscar Peterson albums
Verve Records albums